Percutaneous nephrolithotomy (PCNL) is a minimally-invasive procedure to remove stones from the kidney by a small puncture wound (up to about 1 cm) through the skin. It is most suitable to remove stones of more than 2 cm in size and which are present near the pelvic region. It is usually done under general anesthesia or spinal anesthesia.


Procedure 
A retrograde pyelogram is done to locate the stone in the kidney. Contrast is diluted to the ratio of 1:3. If the ureteric catheter is placed in the upper pole of the kidney, it should be pulled down so that the tip is inside the renal pelvis. This helps for proper filling of the renal calyces. The contrast is injected slowly to prevent extravasation. Fluoroscopy monitoring should be continuous so that the sequence of calyces be filled can help to identify the position of posterior calyx.

With a small 1 centimeter incision in the loin, the percutaneous nephrolithotomy (PCN) needle is passed into the pelvis of the kidney. The position of the needle is confirmed by fluoroscopy. A guide wire is passed through the needle into the pelvis. The needle is then withdrawn with the guide wire still inside the pelvis. Over the guide wire the dilators are passed and a working sheath is introduced.
A nephroscope is then passed inside and small stones taken out. In case the stone is big it may first have to be crushed using ultrasound probes and then the stone fragments removed.

The most difficult portion of the procedure is creating the tract between the kidney and the flank skin.  Most of the time this is achieved by advancing a needle from the flank skin into the kidney, known as the 'antegrade' technique.  A 'retrograde' technique has recently been updated wherein a thin wire is passed from inside the kidney to outside the flank with the aid of a flexible ureteroscope. This technique may reduce radiation exposure for patient and surgeon.

Complications 
The following complications may take place:
 Injury to the colon
 Injury to the lungs
 Injury to the renal blood vessels
 Urinary leak may persist for a few days
 Infection and sepsis
 Hydrothorax if PCNL is done through 11th intercostal space
 Bleeding
 Death

Notes and references 

 

Urologic surgery